Victor Henry Elford (10 June 1935 – 13 March 2022) was an English sports car racing, rallying, and Formula One driver. He participated in 13 World Championship F1 Grands Prix, debuting on 7 July 1968. He scored a total of 8 championship points.

Nicknamed "Quick Vic" by his peers Elford was mainly a famous sports car competitor as well as a successful rally driver, associated often with Porsche.

Career
Elford started as a co-driver, partnering David Seigle-Morris in a Triumph TR3A. By 1961 he had acquired the confidence to see himself as a potential driver in his own right:  the confidence was not shared by team manager Marcus Chambers, and Elford purchased a race-tuned Mini which he rallied as a privateer with limited success before selling it at the end of the season. 1962 found him achieving success in several UK rallies driving a factory sponsored DKW Junior. The next year saw a return to Triumph and Elford achieved impressively fast times with the Triumph TR4s, although reliability of the cars in Elford's hands was disappointing, and the following year Elford switched to Ford:  this was the beginning of a successful three-year rallying stint with the Ford Cortinas.

In 1967 Elford was European rally champion in a works Porsche 911. Among other victories he won the 1968 Rally Monte Carlo in a Porsche 911 and only a week later the 24 Hours of Daytona in a Porsche 907, Porsche's first ever overall win in a 24-hour race.

Later that year, he also won the Targa Florio teamed with veteran Umberto Maglioli in a famous come-from-behind race after he lost 18 minutes in the first lap due to a tyre failure. Elford then entered the French Grand Prix and finished fourth in his first F1 race – a wet one, too.

By finishing the 1969 Monaco Grand Prix despite troubles, he became the only driver to do well in both famous events in Monte Carlo since Louis Chiron.

Racing in the World Sportscar Championship for Martini Racing against the mighty JWA Gulf team, he was clocked at over 380 km/h in the Porsche 917LH in practice for the 1971 24 Hours of Le Mans. He went on to win the 1971 12 Hours of Sebring in a Porsche 917K, as well as several 1000km Nürburgring races.
 
During the 1972 24 Hours of Le Mans, when he saw a burning Ferrari Daytona in front of him, Elford stopped in mid-race to save the driver. When opening the door, Elford found an empty cockpit, as the driver already had escaped. Elford then noticed the wreck of a Lola among the trees, with Jo Bonnier having been killed. Cameras caught the act and Elford was named Chevalier of the National Order of Merit by French President Georges Pompidou.

A Targa Florio, Sebring and Daytona winner, his favourite track was nonetheless the Nürburgring despite the disappointing results in his three F1 attempts there, of which the first two ended in lap 1 accidents. His two last GPs were at the Nürburgring. In addition to the 1000 km, Elford won some 500 km races there, winning a total of 6 major races. Only Rudolf Caracciola and Stirling Moss beat that record.

Elford lap records included: Targa Florio, Nürburgring, Daytona, Sebring, Norisring, Monza, Buenos Aires, Road Atlanta, Laguna Seca, Riverside and Le Mans.

On 4 February 1967 at Lydden Circuit, he won the first ever Rallycross event. Later that year he won the 84 Hour "Marathon de la Route" event at the Nürburgring, on the full 28 km long combined versions that was rarely used since the 1930s. Fellow pilots Hans Herrmann and Jochen Neerpasch preferred "the rally driver" to steer the Porsche 911 through the 7 hours long, four consecutive night turns in rainy and foggy conditions. The winning car was fitted with a semi-automatic Sportomatic transmission, as was another Porsche 911S entered by the factory team.

Although he raced five years for Porsche, Elford also raced for Ford, Triumph, Lancia, Alfa-Romeo, Ferrari, Chaparral, Shadow, Cooper, Lola, Chevron, and Subaru. He also drove McLaren in F1 & CanAm, Chevrolet in TransAm.

Overseas, Elford was also racing in CanAm and the Daytona 500 of NASCAR.

On 25 January 2015, Elford received the 2015 Phil Hill Award from Road Racing Drivers Club. It was presented to him by club president Bobby Rahal.

Personal life
After retiring, Elford lived in South Florida in the United States. Elford died on 13 March 2022, at the age of 86. At the time of his death he had been suffering from cancer for roughly a year.

Racing record

Complete British Saloon Car Championship results
(key) (Races in bold indicate pole position; races in italics indicate fastest lap.)

† Events with 2 races staged for the different classes.

Complete Formula One World Championship results

(key)

Complete 24 Hours of Le Mans results

Bibliography
Elford has authored a number of books on the subject of motorsport:

 Porsche High Performance Driving Handbook  (1994)
 Vic Elford: Reflections on a Golden Era in Motorsports  (2005)

References

External links

"The Official Web Site" of Vic Elford
"Reflections on a golden era of motorsports" interview of Vic Elford

1935 births
2022 deaths
Cooper Formula One drivers
BRM Formula One drivers
English racing drivers
English Formula One drivers
European Formula Two Championship drivers
English rally drivers
European Rally Championship drivers
24 Hours of Le Mans drivers
12 Hours of Reims drivers
Trans-Am Series drivers
Knights of the Ordre national du Mérite
24 Hours of Daytona drivers
World Sportscar Championship drivers
12 Hours of Sebring drivers
British Touring Car Championship drivers
People from Peckham
Deaths from cancer
Porsche Motorsports drivers